Turkey Creek rises in southwest Cary, North Carolina and then flows northeast to join Crabtree Creek.   The watershed is about 5% forested.

See also
List of rivers of North Carolina

References

Rivers of North Carolina
Rivers of Wake County, North Carolina
Tributaries of Pamlico Sound